Massimiliano Christopher Borghi (born April 23, 1999) is an American football running back for the Houston Roughnecks of the XFL. He played college football at Washington State.

Early years
Borghi attended Pomona High School in Arvada, Colorado. As a senior, he had 1,690 rushing yards with 27 touchdowns and helped lead his school to their first state title since 1988. During his high school career, he rushed for 3,512 yards and 50 touchdowns. He committed to Washington State University to play college football.

College career
As a true freshman at Washington State in 2018, Borghi played in all 13 games and made two starts. He had 72 carries for 366 yards and 53 receptions for 374 yards with 12 total touchdowns. As a sophomore in 2019 he started all 13 games, rushing for 817 yards on 127 carries with 11 touchdowns and a team leading 86 receptions for 597 yards and five touchdowns.

College Statistics
Through 2021, Borghi's statistics are as follows:

Professional career

Indianapolis Colts
Borghi signed with the Indianapolis Colts as an undrafted free agent on May 13, 2022. He was waived on May 18.

Denver Broncos
On August 3, 2022, Borghi signed with the Denver Broncos. He was released on August 16, 2022.

Pittsburgh Steelers
On August 18, 2022, Borghi signed with the Pittsburgh Steelers. He was waived on August 30.

Houston Roughnecks 
On November 17, 2022, Borghi was drafted by the Houston Roughnecks of the XFL.

References

External links
Washington State Cougars bio

Living people
People from Arvada, Colorado
Players of American football from Colorado
Sportspeople from the Denver metropolitan area
American football running backs
Washington State Cougars football players
Indianapolis Colts players
Denver Broncos players
Pittsburgh Steelers players
Houston Roughnecks players
2000 births